Brandhoek New Military Cemetery Number 3 is a Commonwealth War Graves Commission burial ground for the dead of the First World War located near Ypres (Dutch: Ieper) in Belgium on the Western Front.

The cemetery grounds were assigned to the United Kingdom in perpetuity by King Albert I of Belgium in recognition of the sacrifices made by the British Empire in the defence and liberation of Belgium during the war.

Foundation
The cemetery was begun by the British in August 1917 during the Battle of Passchendaele to replace the nearby Brandhoek New Military Cemetery.

The cemetery was designed by Sir Reginald Blomfield, with the gates being presented by the father of Lt AH Strutt, one of the soldiers buried within.

References

External links
 
 

Commonwealth War Graves Commission cemeteries in Belgium
Cemeteries and memorials in West Flanders